The Kirov constituency (No.105) is a Russian legislative constituency in Kirov Oblast. The constituency covers parts of Kirov and northern Kirov Oblast.

Members elected

Election results

1993

|-
! colspan=2 style="background-color:#E9E9E9;text-align:left;vertical-align:top;" |Candidate
! style="background-color:#E9E9E9;text-align:left;vertical-align:top;" |Party
! style="background-color:#E9E9E9;text-align:right;" |Votes
! style="background-color:#E9E9E9;text-align:right;" |%
|-
|style="background-color:"|
|align=left|Mikhail Vakulenko
|align=left|Liberal Democratic Party
|
|15.23%
|-
|style="background-color:"|
|align=left|Vladimir Kornilov
|align=left|Independent
| -
|13.90%
|-
| colspan="5" style="background-color:#E9E9E9;"|
|- style="font-weight:bold"
| colspan="3" style="text-align:left;" | Total
| 
| 100%
|-
| colspan="5" style="background-color:#E9E9E9;"|
|- style="font-weight:bold"
| colspan="4" |Source:
|
|}

1995

|-
! colspan=2 style="background-color:#E9E9E9;text-align:left;vertical-align:top;" |Candidate
! style="background-color:#E9E9E9;text-align:left;vertical-align:top;" |Party
! style="background-color:#E9E9E9;text-align:right;" |Votes
! style="background-color:#E9E9E9;text-align:right;" |%
|-
|style="background-color:"|
|align=left|Vladimir Sergeyenkov
|align=left|Independent
|
|24.24%
|-
|style="background-color:#F5821F"|
|align=left|Viktor Savinykh
|align=left|Bloc of Independents
|
|16.73%
|-
|style="background-color:"|
|align=left|Mikhail Vakulenko (incumbent)
|align=left|Liberal Democratic Party
|
|14.59%
|-
|style="background-color:#D50000"|
|align=left|Valery Turulo
|align=left|Communists and Working Russia - for the Soviet Union
|
|6.20%
|-
|style="background-color:"|
|align=left|Nikolay Martyanov
|align=left|Our Home – Russia
|
|5.10%
|-
|style="background-color:"|
|align=left|Anzhey Mikheyev
|align=left|Independent
|
|5.00%
|-
|style="background-color:#1C1A0D"|
|align=left|Vladimir Shalayev
|align=left|Forward, Russia!
|
|4.73%
|-
|style="background-color:#2C299A"|
|align=left|Valery Fokin
|align=left|Congress of Russian Communities
|
|3.85%
|-
|style="background-color:"|
|align=left|Anatoly Bashlakov
|align=left|Serving Russia
|
|3.11%
|-
|style="background-color:#F21A29"|
|align=left|Aleksandr Popov
|align=left|Trade Unions and Industrialists – Union of Labour
|
|2.61%
|-
|style="background-color:#0D0900"|
|align=left|Arkady Mikhaylov
|align=left|People's Union
|
|1.92%
|-
|style="background-color:"|
|align=left|Sergey Plyusnin
|align=left|Independent
|
|1.31%
|-
|style="background-color:#000000"|
|colspan=2 |against all
|
|9.13%
|-
| colspan="5" style="background-color:#E9E9E9;"|
|- style="font-weight:bold"
| colspan="3" style="text-align:left;" | Total
| 
| 100%
|-
| colspan="5" style="background-color:#E9E9E9;"|
|- style="font-weight:bold"
| colspan="4" |Source:
|
|}

1997

|-
! colspan=2 style="background-color:#E9E9E9;text-align:left;vertical-align:top;" |Candidate
! style="background-color:#E9E9E9;text-align:left;vertical-align:top;" |Party
! style="background-color:#E9E9E9;text-align:right;" |Votes
! style="background-color:#E9E9E9;text-align:right;" |%
|-
|style="background-color:"|
|align=left|Nikolay Shaklein
|align=left|Independent
|
|28.56%
|-
|style="background-color:"|
|align=left|Sergey Voronov
|align=left|Independent
|
|23.17%
|-
|style="background-color:"|
|align=left|Anatoly Denisov
|align=left|Independent
|
|16.93%
|-
|style="background-color:"|
|align=left|Valery Turulo
|align=left|Independent
|
|5.83%
|-
|style="background-color:"|
|align=left|Vladimir Molokov
|align=left|Independent
|
|5.18%
|-
|style="background-color:"|
|align=left|Mikhail Koptev
|align=left|Independent
|
|3.37%
|-
|style="background-color:#000000"|
|colspan=2 |against all
|
|10.15%
|-
| colspan="5" style="background-color:#E9E9E9;"|
|- style="font-weight:bold"
| colspan="3" style="text-align:left;" | Total
| 
| 100%
|-
| colspan="5" style="background-color:#E9E9E9;"|
|- style="font-weight:bold"
| colspan="4" |Source:
|
|}

1999

|-
! colspan=2 style="background-color:#E9E9E9;text-align:left;vertical-align:top;" |Candidate
! style="background-color:#E9E9E9;text-align:left;vertical-align:top;" |Party
! style="background-color:#E9E9E9;text-align:right;" |Votes
! style="background-color:#E9E9E9;text-align:right;" |%
|-
|style="background-color:"|
|align=left|Nikolay Shaklein (incumbent)
|align=left|Independent
|
|44.47%
|-
|style="background:#1042A5"| 
|align=left|Oleg Baboshin
|align=left|Union of Right Forces
|
|8.39%
|-
|style="background-color:"|
|align=left|Mikhail Vakulenko
|align=left|Independent
|
|7.72%
|-
|style="background-color:"|
|align=left|Mikhail Savinykh
|align=left|Yabloko
|
|7.35%
|-
|style="background-color:#E2CA66"|
|align=left|Vladimir Agalakov
|align=left|For Civil Dignity
|
|4.87%
|-
|style="background-color:#D50000"|
|align=left|Yury Akusba
|align=left|Communists and Workers of Russia - for the Soviet Union
|
|2.79%
|-
|style="background-color:"|
|align=left|Aleksandr Kolosov
|align=left|Independent
|
|2.78%
|-
|style="background-color:#3B9EDF"|
|align=left|Vladimir Sysolyatin
|align=left|Fatherland – All Russia
|
|2.10%
|-
|style="background-color:"|
|align=left|Nikolay Gvozdev
|align=left|Independent
|
|2.02%
|-
|style="background-color:"|
|align=left|Sergey Luzyanin
|align=left|Independent
|
|1.65%
|-
|style="background-color:"|
|align=left|Nikolay Dengin
|align=left|Independent
|
|1.26%
|-
|style="background-color:"|
|align=left|Yevgeny Klevachkin
|align=left|Our Home – Russia
|
|1.09%
|-
|style="background-color:#084284"|
|align=left|Nikolay Solomin
|align=left|Spiritual Heritage
|
|0.49%
|-
|style="background-color:#000000"|
|colspan=2 |against all
|
|11.56%
|-
| colspan="5" style="background-color:#E9E9E9;"|
|- style="font-weight:bold"
| colspan="3" style="text-align:left;" | Total
| 
| 100%
|-
| colspan="5" style="background-color:#E9E9E9;"|
|- style="font-weight:bold"
| colspan="4" |Source:
|
|}

2003

|-
! colspan=2 style="background-color:#E9E9E9;text-align:left;vertical-align:top;" |Candidate
! style="background-color:#E9E9E9;text-align:left;vertical-align:top;" |Party
! style="background-color:#E9E9E9;text-align:right;" |Votes
! style="background-color:#E9E9E9;text-align:right;" |%
|-
|style="background-color:"|
|align=left|Aleksey Rozuvan
|align=left|United Russia
|
|23.70%
|-
|style="background-color:"|
|align=left|Vladimir Sergeyenkov
|align=left|Independent
|
|13.16%
|-
|style="background-color:"|
|align=left|Oleg Skachkov
|align=left|Independent
|
|9.75%
|-
|style="background:#1042A5"| 
|align=left|Aleksandr Poglazov
|align=left|Union of Right Forces
|
|8.74%
|-
|style="background-color:"|
|align=left|Dmitry Ikonnikov
|align=left|Yabloko
|
|6.75%
|-
|style="background-color:#D50000"|
|align=left|Valery Turulo
|align=left|Russian Communist Workers Party-Russian Party of Communists
|
|5.13%
|-
|style="background-color:"|
|align=left|Aleksandr Ryazanov
|align=left|Liberal Democratic Party
|
|4.41%
|-
|style="background-color:"|
|align=left|Vladimir Kulikov
|align=left|Independent
|
|4.13%
|-
|style="background-color:#C21022"|
|align=left|Nikolay Bezdenezhnykh
|align=left|Russian Pensioners' Party-Party of Social Justice
|
|3.71%
|-
|style="background-color:#164C8C"|
|align=left|Boris Shabalin
|align=left|United Russian Party Rus'
|
|3.28%
|-
|style="background-color:#000000"|
|colspan=2 |against all
|
|14.27%
|-
| colspan="5" style="background-color:#E9E9E9;"|
|- style="font-weight:bold"
| colspan="3" style="text-align:left;" | Total
| 
| 100%
|-
| colspan="5" style="background-color:#E9E9E9;"|
|- style="font-weight:bold"
| colspan="4" |Source:
|
|}

2016

|-
! colspan=2 style="background-color:#E9E9E9;text-align:left;vertical-align:top;" |Candidate
! style="background-color:#E9E9E9;text-align:left;vertical-align:top;" |Party
! style="background-color:#E9E9E9;text-align:right;" |Votes
! style="background-color:#E9E9E9;text-align:right;" |%
|-
|style="background-color: " |
|align=left|Rakhim Azimov
|align=left|United Russia
|
|51.22%
|-
|style="background-color:"|
|align=left|Aleksandr Maltsev
|align=left|A Just Russia
|
|13.47%
|-
|style="background-color:"|
|align=left|Aleksey Votintsev
|align=left|Communist Party
|
|12.81%
|-
|style="background:"| 
|align=left|Nikolay Barsukov
|align=left|Communists of Russia
|
|6.75%
|-
|style="background:"| 
|align=left|Andrey Orlov
|align=left|Party of Growth
|
|3.71%
|-
|style="background-color:"|
|align=left|Sergey Rogozhkin
|align=left|Patriots of Russia
|
|3.50%
|-
|style="background:"| 
|align=left|Andrey Perov
|align=left|Yabloko
|
|2.67%
|-
| colspan="5" style="background-color:#E9E9E9;"|
|- style="font-weight:bold"
| colspan="3" style="text-align:left;" | Total
| 
| 100%
|-
| colspan="5" style="background-color:#E9E9E9;"|
|- style="font-weight:bold"
| colspan="4" |Source:
|
|}

2021

|-
! colspan=2 style="background-color:#E9E9E9;text-align:left;vertical-align:top;" |Candidate
! style="background-color:#E9E9E9;text-align:left;vertical-align:top;" |Party
! style="background-color:#E9E9E9;text-align:right;" |Votes
! style="background-color:#E9E9E9;text-align:right;" |%
|-
|style="background-color: " |
|align=left|Rakhim Azimov (incumbent)
|align=left|United Russia
|
|43.77%
|-
|style="background-color:"|
|align=left|Albert Bikalyuk
|align=left|A Just Russia — For Truth
|
|14.90%
|-
|style="background-color:"|
|align=left|Kirill Cherkasov
|align=left|Liberal Democratic Party
|
|7.39%
|-
|style="background:"| 
|align=left|Nikolay Barsukov
|align=left|Communists of Russia
|
|7.11%
|-
|style="background-color:"|
|align=left|Aleksey Semeyshchev
|align=left|Communist Party
|
|7.05%
|-
|style="background-color: " |
|align=left|Andrey Iglin
|align=left|New People
|
|5.59%
|-
|style="background-color: "|
|align=left|Svetlana Opaleva
|align=left|Party of Pensioners
|
|5.28%
|-
|style="background-color: " |
|align=left|Roman Bokov
|align=left|Yabloko
|
|2.70%
|-
|style="background-color: "|
|align=left|Fyodor Luginin
|align=left|Rodina
|
|2.13%
|-
| colspan="5" style="background-color:#E9E9E9;"|
|- style="font-weight:bold"
| colspan="3" style="text-align:left;" | Total
| 
| 100%
|-
| colspan="5" style="background-color:#E9E9E9;"|
|- style="font-weight:bold"
| colspan="4" |Source:
|
|}

Notes

References

Russian legislative constituencies
Politics of Kirov Oblast